Four-time defending champions Peter Fleming and John McEnroe successfully defended their title, defeating Sherwood Stewart and Ferdi Taygan in the final, 7–5, 6–3 to win the doubles tennis title at the 1982 Masters Grand Prix.

Seeds 

  Sherwood Stewart /  Ferdi Taygan
  Peter Fleming /  John McEnroe

Draw

Finals

External links 
 ITF tournament edition details

Doubles